Senza sangue (Without blood) is one act opera and the fourth one composed by Péter Eötvös. The opera libretto was written by Mari Mezei, and is sung in Italian. The concert première was given by the New York Philharmonic conducted by Alan Gilbert on 1 May 2015 at the Kölner Philharmonie. The stage premiere was on 15 May 2016 at the Festival d'Avignon. Anne Sofie von Otter, who sang in the New York première with the New York Philharmonic, said: "The piece is not at all easy for the two singers... [It's] hard to find the pitch; you have to work it into the voice, unless of course you happen to have perfect pitch, which I don't."

Roles

Synopsis 

The opera is set in the time of a civil war in an unnamed country. A little girl called Nina experiences her family being killed in their home by fighters. Nina herself only survived because she was hiding. One of the murderers had traced her, but she was spared. The following years were spent in a kind of schizophrenic condition, while her saviour was gripped by the realization that the victim's daughter knows his face.

Over the years, Nina gradually took revenge on all murderers except for her saviour, who is confronted in a cafe by Nina. Instead of anger, however, they begin to talk. Nina and Tito (her saviour) recall the terrible events of their childhood, Nina revealing that she was forcibly married at 14, and reflect on the incomprehensibility of life. They eventually fall in love with each other and elope at the opera's end.

Structure 
The opera is broken up into seven scenes, replete with an orchestral introduction and epilogue. The introduction is dedicated to Henri Dutilleux  who, at the time of composing, had recently passed at 96.

References

External links
"Vértelenül" [improper blood], by Anna Belinszky, 27 April 2015 (in Hungarian)

2015 operas
Operas by Peter Eötvös
Italian-language operas
One-act operas
Operas
Operas based on novels